Royal Consort Jeongsin of the Incheon Yi clan was a Korean queen consort and the first wife of King Seonjong of Goryeo, her second cousin. She was the second Goryeo queen consort who didn't receive Posthumous name like the other queen consorts following Lady Wang.

She was the daughter of Yi-Ye (이예), son of Yi Ja-sang (이자상) and younger brother of Yi Ja-yeon (이자연). It seems that she married Seonjong when he was still "Duke Gukwon" (국원공) and then became "Duchess Consort Gukwon" (국원공비, 國原公妃) while lived in his manor. Although she was the first wife, but she didn't lived long and bore him a daughter who later became Yejong of Goryeo's first wife. In 1107, her son-in-law tried to orient himself at Seonjong's tomb, but was not accomplished due to the opposition from his officials.

References

External links
Royal Consort Jeongsin on Encykorea .
정신현비 on Doosan Encyclopedia .

Royal consorts of the Goryeo Dynasty
Korean queens consort
11th-century Korean people
Year of birth unknown
Year of death unknown
Incheon Lee clan